Christoph Thoke (born November 15, 1960) is a German film and television producer.

Thoke has primarily worked as on-air promotion producer for German broadcaster  RTL 2 and German-French broadcaster Arte. From 1996 until 2002 he has been part of the management at German production and service companies Bavaria Film, TaunusFilm and CineMedia, where he started as assistant to general manager and later became executive for production and acquisition.

At Taunusfilm, he oversaw all international production activities including the LA office of Taunusfilm International while at Cinemedia he was involved in acquisition of films such as What Women Want starring Mel Gibson.

Christoph's producing credits at that time included: 

In 2003, Christoph joined forces with Axel Moebius to produce through their own company Thoke + Moebius Film (TMF). At TMF Christoph has been able to produce or coproduce a slate of nine titles such as Tropical Malady from Apichatpong Weerasethakul, a major arthouse sensation which got Jury Price in Cannes 2004 (jury presidency: Quentin Tarantino) and was regarded as best film of the year 2004 by Cahiers du cinéma.

Other titles at TMF include Bruno Dumont’s Twentynine Palms (film), Venice 2003, Official Competition, The Buffalo Boy, official entry from Vietnam for Best Foreign Language Film category at the 78th Academy Awards and Wedding Chest, official entry from Kyrgyzstan for Best Foreign Language Film category at the 79th Academy Awards.

2007 Christoph moved on and founded production outfit Mogador Film, from where he is going to produce for the local and international market. 
First project has been Lorna's Silence directed by Jean-Pierre & Luc Dardenne (Dardenne brothers).
Film got selected for official competition in Cannes 2008 and was awarded Price for 
Best Script (jury presidency: Sean Penn).
So far, Lorna's Silence has been sold to more than 30 countries including U.S., where Sony Classics is going to distribute the movie theatrically.

In total, Christoph’s movies have been invited to about 500 festivals and garnered more than 100 awards around the globe.
His films have been widely sold internationally; five titles got a U.S. release.

Tutoring, panels and consultancy
Furthermore, Christoph has an extensive experience as moderator, tutor and consultant 
to name f.e.:

Moderator, Producers Network, Festival de Cannes 2007, 2009
Tutor (Production), MedaFilmsDevelopment, Euromed II, Marrakech 2006–2008,
Tutor (Production), Film Business School, Ronda 2008,
Project Consultant (Production), Babylon Feature Film Project Development Workshop, Rotterdam, Cannes  2007–2009
as well as Panelist at the Rotterdam Lab with Jani Thilgtes, Rotterdam International Film Festival 2005 and Panelist on “International Producers in Europe” with Karl Baumgartner and Marco Müller, eDit 8. Filmmaker’s Festival, Frankfurt 2005.

Christoph is both member of the European Film Academy and the German Film Academy 
and just recently he has served on the international jury of the Muhr Awards for Excellence in 
Arab Cinema of the 5th Dubai International Film Festival.

See also
Bruno Dumont
Love (2005 film)
The Buffalo Boy
Tropical Malady
Twentynine Palms (film)
2004 Cannes Film Festival
Submissions for the 78th Academy Award for Best Foreign Film
LUBOV AND OTHER NIGHTMAREs  film cedits at dreamscanner.com
Little Senegal (film)'
Lorna's Silence

External links

New York Times filmography

1960 births
Living people
German film producers